Élodie Clouvel (born 14 January 1989) is a French modern pentathlete. At the 2012 Summer Olympics, she competed finishing in 31st place which also marked her maiden appearance at the Summer Olympics. She won the silver medal in the event at the 2016 Olympic Games. She is also currently serving as the second lieutenant of the National Gendarmerie. Her father Pascal Clouvel was a middle and long-distance runner, while her mother Annick Clouvel was also a long-distance runner.

She also took part at the 2019 Military World Games which was held in Wuhan and claimed a gold medal in the women's modern pentathlon individual event. After returning from the Military World Games in October, she and her partner Valentin Belaud said that both of them were infected with COVID-19 after falling ill with developing unusual symptoms, however no testing to confirm this was made public.

References

External links
 
 
 
 
 

1989 births
Living people
French female modern pentathletes
Olympic modern pentathletes of France
Modern pentathletes at the 2012 Summer Olympics
Modern pentathletes at the 2016 Summer Olympics
Modern pentathletes at the 2020 Summer Olympics
World Modern Pentathlon Championships medalists
Medalists at the 2016 Summer Olympics
Olympic silver medalists for France
Olympic medalists in modern pentathlon
People from Saint-Priest-en-Jarez
Sportspeople from Loire (department)
20th-century French women
21st-century French women